The FOM ild - Institute for Logistics and Service Management is a German research institute located in Essen. The institute belongs to the FOM - Fachhochschule fuer Oekonomie und Management and also has had close relationships with many major German companies. It was founded in 2009 and analyses aspects in the field of logistics and services.

Skills and expertise 
The main target of FOM ild is to develop and support the exchange and transfer between applied research and business practice in the sector of logistics, supply chain management, procurement, service management and public management. Researchers of the institute analyze innovative and sustainable logistics and service concepts regarding quality management, productivity measurement, operations research, qualifications and education research and process management. Their research results are used for professional and related subject discourses; they also adopt the results for the securing of the transfer between the science and business practice. FOM Institute for logistics and service management (ild) is an institute of FOM University of Applied Sciences and is very well prepared to adopt various tasks in science and practice. FOM ild disposes of a network of scientists and practitioners with know-how.

Fields of activity 
 Trends and new technological and organizational developments in logistics (LOGFOR project)
 Qualification (vocational and academic) in logistics(WiWeLo project in the German national excellence cluster LogistikRuhr)
 GPS.LAB - shipment-based GPS location and real-time transport control (e.g. for carbon allocation, dynamic production scheduling, SCEM)
 Green Logistics (E-Mobility, general concepts, Carbon Footprinting)
 Simulation and operations research in logistics
 Dangerous goods transportation
 Humanitarian logistics

Publications 
Beside publications in the form of articles in journals the institute also regularly publishes working papers, which concentrate on a specific aspect/trend of logistic or service management.

References

External links
Working papers

International research institutes